The diving competitions at the 2023 Pan American Games in Santiago, Chile are scheduled to take place from October 26 to 30, 2023 at the Aquatics Centre. It will be one of four aquatic sports at the Games, along with swimming, water polo, and artistic swimming.

The games will feature competitions in ten events (men and women events each of): 1m springboard, 3m springboard, synchronised 3m springboard, 10m platform, and synchronised 10m platform.

The winner of each individual 3m and 10m event (if not already qualified) will qualify for the 2024 Summer Olympics in Paris, France.

Qualification

A total of 80 divers (40 per gender) will qualify to compete. A nation may enter a maximum of 10 divers (if entering teams in synchronized diving) or 6 athletes (if not entering teams in synchronized diving), with the exception of the winners of the 2021 Junior Pan American Games, provided that these athletes participate only in the event in which they qualified in Cali. The host nation (Chile) automatically qualified a full team of 10 athletes (five per gender). The top 18 men and women in individual events in the 2022 and 2023 FINA World Championships will secure spots for their NOCs. In addition, at each of the CONSANAT Championships (Zone 1) and the PAQ Qualifying Diving Championships (Zone 2), divers from federations competing in such events may earn a quota position for their NOCs provided that the total number of divers from such Zones do not exceed 24 divers on all boards (including those who are ranked in FINA from such competing federations but excluding any divers from CHI). Zone 3 and 4 divers do not have separate qualifiers within their zones. National championships or trials events in Zones 3 and 4 may be used to name divers to already qualified positions.

Medal summary

Men's Events

Women's Events

See also
Diving at the 2024 Summer Olympics

References

Events at the 2023 Pan American Games
2023
2023 in diving